Galeria shopping and entertainment center is located in the center of St Petersburg, Russia, at the juncture of two of the city's major avenues - Nevsky and Ligovsky Prospect.

Galeria opened on November 25, 2010. There are more than 300 shops, 28 restaurants and cafes and 10 cinema screens (including IMAX) in the five-floor center. There is underground parking with a capacity for 1200 cars and additional bicycle parking.

Galeria has a variety of stores selling clothes, accessories, sports equipment, footwear, and gifts. Available brands include H&M, Zara, Reserved and luxury brands such as Pinko, Falconeri, Karen Millen, Lagerfeld, Michael Kors, DKNY, Armani, Marco Polo, Hugo Boss, Max Mara Weekend, Stefanel.

Incidents
According to Russian newspapers, a terrorist attack on the shopping mall was prevented by the Federal Security Service (FSB) in November 2016.

References

External links

Shopping malls in Russia
Buildings and structures in Saint Petersburg
Shopping malls established in 2010